A man cave or manspace, and less commonly a manland or mantuary is a male retreat or sanctuary in a home, such as a specially equipped garage, spare bedroom, media room, den, basement, or tree house. The term "man cave" describes an area in the home where a man can do as he pleases in a masculine space. In 2005, Paula Aymer of Tufts University suggested it was the "last bastion of masculinity". The first known published use of the phrase is from March 21, 1992, in the Toronto Star by Joanne Lovering: "With his cave of solitude secured against wife intrusion by cold floors, musty smells and a few strategic cobwebs, he will stay down there for hours nestled in very manly magazines and open boxes of tools. Let's call the basement, man cave." The phrase gained traction with the 1993 publication of Men Are from Mars, Women Are from Venus by John Gray.

Purpose
Man caves have multiple purposes: they are a place to be alone, to indulge in hobbies such as watching sports or playing video games, and to hang out with male friends. According to psychiatrist and author Scott Haltzman, it is important for a man to have a place to call his own. 

Writer and handyman Sam Martin explained:

Sociologist Tristan Bridges has interviewed American men and their partners about man caves, and found that many men rarely used their man caves. One interviewee said, "I feel like some day guys from my neighbourhood will congregate here after work and we'll share a beer and chat." When asked who these men from the neighborhood were, the interviewee replied "I don't know". Bridges stated that his research has turned partly into "a story about men's loneliness."

Design

According to several sources, the general architectural and design trend of the early 2000s was for men to take traditionally male-only spaces, and equip them with masculine aesthetic choices. Man cave accessories include refrigerators, vending machines, putting greens, kegerators, giant TVs, musical instruments and gear, pool tables, boxing rings, entertainment centers, bars, and sports memorabilia such as trophies. Upscale sports-themed furnishings are available to outfit a man cave. The room may be large enough to accommodate a big screen television, often used for watching sports games with male friends.

In the book Where Men Hide, which Publishers Weekly described as an affable but only "sometimes thought provoking" guide, author James Twitchell and photographer Ken Ross explored areas where men like to be alone. According to Twitchell, some public male-only spaces, such as the barbershop, are declining and being replaced by spaces such as the "grimy garage." The book suggests that "men make their own spaces for good or ill." Twitchell focused on communal man cave spaces such as male-only groups in megachurches, possibly a modern-day replacement for declining attendance at male-only clubs such as Masonic lodges. Twitchell noted that some anthropologists have speculated that these spots are a place for men to bond before hunting or war, and where they can "smoke or fart" and tell the "same jokes over and over again."

One man redecorated his space to look like a replica model of the bridge of the Starship Enterprise from the TV show Star Trek, while another man spent over two years and $120,000 to make his man cave into a Batcave. 

Garages have typically been a male space since they "present a guy with an opportunity to disappear for hours while never leaving the premises." In 2007, it was common for men to "lavish time, money and attention on fixing this spot up", with the intention of making it more welcoming.

Counterparts 
Women have created similar spaces in which they can relax and pursue hobbies. These have been referred to as "she-sheds" and "girl-caves". Some analysts have described the manosphere as an online counterpart to the man-cave.

In popular culture
There have been several examples of man caves in pop culture, including:

 Al Bundy's garage from the TV sitcom Married... with Children: Al Bundy's garage was his only sanctuary. It was also used to hold the recurring "No Ma'am" meetings.
 Tim Taylor's garage in the TV sitcom Home Improvement: Tim Taylor used to "bring to life all manner of high-powered monster machines."
 Bada Bing room in the TV show The Sopranos: Tony Soprano's gang would meet in a windowless "dingy office" at the Bada Bing strip club. It was a "guys-only place within a guys-only place."
 Doug's garage in the TV show The King of Queens, Doug Heffernan's garage is equipped with a big screen TV, beer fridge, and a couch where Doug and his friends watch football, baseball, and boxing and drink beer in peace away from Doug's wife, Carrie, and Doug's father-in-law, Arthur Spooner.
 Charles Deetz's den in the 1988 movie Beetlejuice. It is the only room that survives an extensive home renovation initiated by his wife and her decorator.

See also

 Andron
 Cabinet (room)
 Home tiki bars
 Male bonding
 Mancation
 Personal space
 Recreation room
 Shed
 ManSpace (TV series)
 Man Caves, a home renovation program specifically targeted in the creation of man caves.

References

Cave
Rooms